Fuyun Koktokay Airport  is an airport serving Fuyun County in Altay Prefecture, Xinjiang, China.

It served a single route to Ürümqi until it was canceled in 1994, after the closing of the Koktokay mine.

In November 2011, the State Council of China approved the proposal to move and rebuild Fuyun Airport.  The new airport is located near the intersection of the provincial highway 226 and the national highway 216,  from the county seat.  It is a class 4C regional airport, and the airport was projected to cost 410 million yuan to build. The airport was opened on 1 August 2015, when the inaugural China Southern Airlines flight from Urumqi Diwopu International Airport landed at the airport.

Airlines and destinations

See also
List of airports in China
List of the busiest airports in China

References

Airports in Xinjiang
Airports established in 2015
Altay Prefecture
2015 establishments in China